Richard Whitcomb, may refer to:

 Richard S. Whitcomb (1894–1982), a United States Army general
 Richard T. Whitcomb (1921–2009), an American aeronautical engineer